Hilltop Christian School (HCS), is a private, coeducational, primary and secondary Christian day school located in Fuquay-Varina, North Carolina,  United States. The religious head of the school is Pastor Jeff Jones.

Baptist schools in the United States
Christian schools in North Carolina
Fuquay-Varina, North Carolina
Private middle schools in North Carolina
Private high schools in North Carolina
Private elementary schools in North Carolina
Schools in Wake County, North Carolina